L'Ordre et la sécurité du monde (Italian title: CIA contro KGB, US title: Last In, First Out) is a 1978 French-Italian film. It stars Bruno Cremer, Donald Pleasence and Gabriele Ferzetti.

Cast
Bruno Cremer - Lucas Richter 
Dennis Hopper - Medford 
Donald Pleasence - Rothko 
Laure Dechasnel - Hélène Lehman 
Joseph Cotten - Foster Johnson 
Gabriele Ferzetti - Herzog 
Michel Bouquet - Banquier Muller 
Pierre Santini - Martial Kauffer

References

External links

1978 films
1970s French-language films
French spy drama films
French thriller films
1970s Italian-language films
1970s political thriller films
1978 multilingual films
English-language French films
English-language Italian films
French multilingual films
Italian multilingual films
1970s Italian films
1970s French films
French-language Italian films